Ramjidas Rishidev was an Indian politician and former cabinet minister in the Government of Bihar from November 2005 to November 2010. He represented Araria in Lok Sabha in 1998 and Raniganj in Bihar Legislative Assembly in 2005.

References 

1954 births
2020 deaths
Bihar MLAs 2005–2010
Bharatiya Janata Party politicians from Bihar
India MPs 1998–1999
Lok Sabha members from Bihar
People from Araria district